Wilma Valle Galvante is the former head of TV5's entertainment division and former GMA Network's senior vice president for entertainment; she is also a producer of numerous TV shows.

As the chief of the GMA Network's entertainment block, she experimented with dramas and light-hearted shows and hired writers. She revived the love team tandem popularized in the 1970s, resurrected local comics titles and introduced fantasy series on prime time such as Mulawin. Through her initiative, the network brought the rights to a number of local comics titles such as Darna and Captain Barbell. By the last quarter of 2003, GMA's primetime shows led over the rival network's.

On September 11, 2015, Galvante left her post as the Entertainment Head of TV5, to form Content Cows Company Inc. which produced TV5 programs including Happy Truck ng Bayan and Wattpad Presents.

Early life and career
After graduating from the Pamantasan ng Lungsod ng Maynila, Wilma was employed as a production assistant at Radio Philippines Network. Through this early work experience, she learned how to run a TV show from the financial to production aspect.

She became a sought-after line producer in the 1970s and 1980s that even the film greats such as Lino Brocka and Lupita Kashiwahara demanded that she work for them. She worked at ungodly hours.

Her first taste of success was when she conceptualized Ang Bagong Kampeon (The New Champion) that became a huge primetime hit. The show kick-started other talent shows.

Galvante was hired as Senior for Vice President for entertainment of GMA Network on 1993. She produced successful and popular dramas on the network like the Filipino adaptation of MariMar, Codename: Asero and The Good Daughter. She also led the GMA Network on becoming the no.1 TV station in the Philippines after the network's shows dominated the ratings in October 2004.

References

External links
 

1952 births
Living people
Filipino television producers
Women television producers
Pamantasan ng Lungsod ng Maynila alumni
TV5 Network executives
GMA Network (company) executives
Radio Philippines Network people